Mr Simigdáli ("The Gentleman Made of Groats", in Max Lüthi's translation) is a Greek fairy tale, collected by Irene Naumann-Mavrogordato in Es war einmal: Neugriechische Volksmärchen. Georgios A. Megas collected a variant Master Semolina in Folktales of Greece.  There are about forty known Greek variants on the fairy tale of baking a figure and having it brought to life. It is Aarne-Thompson type 425, the search for the lost bridegroom, in an unusual variation, involving motifs similar to Pygmalion and Galatea.

Synopsis
A king's daughter refuses all her suitors.  She takes almonds, sugar, and groats—or semolina—and makes the figure of a man from them.  Then she prays for forty days, and God brings the figure to life.  He is called Mr Simigdáli (Mr Groats)—or Master Semolina if made from that—and is very handsome.  An evil queen hears of him and sends a golden ship to kidnap him.  Everyone comes out to see it, and the sailors as instructed- capture Mr Simigdáli.  The princess learns how he had been carried off, has three pairs of iron shoes made for herself, and sets out.

With the first pair of iron shoes worn out, she comes to the mother of the Moon, who has her wait until the Moon comes, but the Moon can not tell her where Mr Simigdáli has been taken, and sends her on to the Sun, having given her an almond for her to break upon need.  The Sun and its mother give her a walnut and send her on to the Stars.  No star has seen him, except for a little star which then takes her to the castle where Mr Simigdáli is prisoner after being given to drink the water of oblivion, and the star gives her a hazelnut.  She looks like a beggar and he does not recognize her, so she begs for a job taking care of the geese.

Then she breaks the almond and it holds a golden spindle, reel and wheel.  The servants tell the queen, who asks what she wants for her; the princess will trade it only for Mr Simigdáli to spend a night with her.  The queen agrees but gives Mr Simigdáli a sleeping potion.  The princess tries to talk to him but she cannot wake him.  Then she breaks the walnut, which contains a golden hen and her chicks, and she tries and fails again.  The hazelnut contains golden carnations, but that day, a tailor, who lives next to the girl who tends to the geese, asks Mr Simigdáli how he can sleep at night what with all the girl's talk.  Mr Simigdáli realises something is off so he secretly readies his horse and only pretends to drink the potion; so, when the princess begins to talk to him, he rises and takes her with him on his horse.

In the morning, the queen sends for him, but he is not there. She tries to make her own man, but when the figure is done, she curses instead of praying, and the figure rots. The princess and Mr Simigdáli return home and live happily ever after. And, as the Greek saying has it, they lived happily but we lived even more so!

Analysis 
Although the tale is classified as the more general type ATU 425, "The Search for the Lost Husband", the tale pertains to a cycle of stories found in Italy, Greece and Turkey, about a heroine creating her own husband. It could be considered, therefore, a subtype specific to Italy. The type is also considered a Greek-Turkish oikotype of The Disenchanted Husband, which, according to 's study, falls under type 425B: the artificial husband created by the heroine and the exchange of three nuts for three nights with her husband.

Motifs 
Pintosmalto is a literary variant of the tale of the lost husband. The Armenian Nature's Ways follows part of it, ending with the princess's marriage to the newly created man. Other variants of the search for the lost bridegroom usually involve an enchanted man rather than a newly created one, as in The Enchanted Pig, East of the Sun and West of the Moon, and Black Bull of Norroway.  The Two Kings' Children includes a similar series of exchanges for the true bride to reach the bridegroom.

According to Max Lüthi, the heroine cracks open the nuts and almonds she gets from her helpers and finds beautiful dresses that depict the skies (or heavens), the earth and the seas. In addition, Lüthi remarked that the reference to forty indicated the presence of the tale in the Orient, since the numeral has cultural significance for Middle Eastern cultures (e.g., indicating a period of maturation or purification).

The hero's ingredients 
Folklorists  and Michael Merakles noted that in these tales, the hero is named after the materials with which he was created. As such, Greek variants of the tale are known as Moscambaris or Muscambre, after the materials used to build the husband: namely, musk and amber. In addition, German scholar Max Lüthi noted that sugar appears to be "the crucial ingredient" in most variants from Greece and Italy.

Variants 
Folklorist Ruth Ann Musick collected a variant from West Virginia from a man named Jon De Luca, in Fairmont, who learned from his mother, who learned from her mother. In this tale, titled The Dough Prince, a princess who cannot find any fitting suitor, decides to create her own lover: she mixes dough and shapes it like a human male, to whom she gives life with a kiss. As it happens in other tales, the prince is captured by a foreign queen, and his princess goes after him. She meets an old man who gives her three valuable stones and she trades them for three nights with the prince.

Russian professor V. A. Yaremenko translated into Russian an Iraqi tale titled "Султан Анбар" ("Sultan Ambar"): a princess is courted by many men, but she chooses no suitor. Fed up with all the rejected princes and emirs, the king announces he will wed her to the first suitor. The princess, then, decides to build herself a husband, with musk, ambar (or ambergris), rose water and Indian perfumes. She prays to Allah to give him a soul and animate him, and her prayers are answered. She takes the artificial man to her father and introduces him as Sultan Ambar, her fiancé. A witch princess from another country hears about Sultan Ambar's beauty and kidnapps him after their wedding. The princess journeys far and wide to find him, and has some adventures on the way there, by helping kings and villages. She is rewarded with a chicken with chicks that eat pearls instead of grains, a dress encrusted with pearls and a saad bird made of diamond and eyes of agate. The princess uses the three items as bribes to buy three nights in her husband's bed in the witch princess's castle.

German linguist Paul Kretschmer translated a Greek tale into German as Der Mann aus Zucker ("The Man [made] of Sugar").

Footnotes

References

Greek fairy tales
Fiction about shapeshifting
Witchcraft in fairy tales
ATU 400-459